George Fowler may refer to:
 George Fowler (politician) (1839–1896), South Australian businessman and politician
 George Fowler (magistrate) (1858–1937), English solicitor and magistrate
 George William Fowler (1859–1924), Canadian MP and Senator from New Brunswick
 George D. Fowler (1860–1909), Pennsylvania Railroad official
 George Herbert Fowler (1861–1940), English zoologist, historian and archivist
 George Fowler (footballer) (born 1998), English footballer
 George Fowler (cricketer) (1860–1934), New Zealand cricketer
 George Ryerson Fowler, surgeon from Brooklyn, New York